Sussex is a civil parish in Kings County, New Brunswick, Canada.

For governance purposes it is divided between the town of Sussex, the village of Sussex Corner, and the local service district of the parish of Sussex (which further includes the special service area of Apohaqui), all of which are members of Regional Service Commission 8 (RSC8).

Origin of name
Historian William Francis Ganong noted that Sussex, New Jersey was a Loyalist stronghold and that members of a New Jersey regiment settled in the area. The fact that the names of the four original parishes and two 1795 parishes of Kings County are all found in New Jersey is also mentioned.

The Duke of Sussex origin noted elsewhere is problematic, as he didn't hold that title until 1801.

Notable is that the names of Kings County's pre-1800 parishes all occur in both New Jersey and North Carolina.

History
Sussex was erected in 1786 as one of the original parishes of the county, stretching from Kennebecasis Bay to the eastern line of the county, which then was north of St. Martins.

In 1787 a large area was added to Sussex when the county's eastern boundary was moved significantly eastward to run due north and south from the portage between the Petitcodiac and Kennebecasis Rivers.

In the 1795 reorganisation of the county the western part of Sussex formed the bulk of Hampton Parish. By this time Sussex included Cardwell, Havelock, Studholm, and Waterford Parishes.

In 1837 the eastern boundary of the county was altered, adding area to the southeastern corner of Sussex and removing it from the northeastern corner.

In 1840 Studholm was erected as its own parish, including Havelock.

In 1874 Cardwell and Waterford became parishes.

In 1875 the boundary with Hammond Parish was altered.

Boundaries
Sussex Parish is bounded:

 on the north by the Kennebecasis River;
 on the east by a line beginning at the Kennebecasis River, about one kilometre east of Plumweseep Road and about 900 metres north-northwesterly of Route 114, then running south-southeasterly along the prolongation of the eastern line of a large grant to Elias Snyder on the north side of Trout Creek, the line being about 75 metres east of the end of Taverner Road, to Trout Creek, then downstream about 500 metres to the eastern line of a grant to Cornelius Parlee, then south-southeasterly to the southern line of the parish about one kilometre east of the Londonderry Road;
 on the south by a line running westerly from a point in Waterford Parish about 450 metres south of the southern tip of Walton Lake and about 150 metres west of the Creek Road to a point about 825 metres north of Cassidy Lake near its western end, then westerly to a point about 75 metres south of Byrnes Brook and 300 metres east-northeasterly of the Byrne Road;
 on the west by a line running north from the southern line of the parish to a point on the Kennebecasis River opposite the mouth of Halfway Brook.

Communities
Communities at least partly within the parish. bold indicates an incorporated municipality

  Apohaqui
  Campbell Settlement
 Drurys Cove
 Erb Settlement
 Jeffries Corner
 Lisson Settlement
 Lower Cove
 Markhamville
 McCain Settlement
 New Line Road
 Poodiac
 Ratter Corner
 Riverbank
 Rockville
 Southfield
  Sussex
  Sussex Corner
 Dutch Valley
 Upper Wards Creek
 Vinegar Hill
 Wards Creek

Bodies of water
Bodies of water at least partly within the parish.
  Hammond River
 Kennebecasis River
 Trout Creek
 Wards Creek
 DeCourcey Lake

Other notable places
Parks, historic sites, and other noteworthy places at least partly within the parish.
 Sussex Aerodrome

Demographics
Parish population total does not include the municipalities of Sussex and Sussex Corner

Population
Population trend

Language
Mother tongue (2016)

Access Routes
Highways and numbered routes that run through the parish, including external routes that start or finish at the parish limits:

Highways

Principal Routes

Secondary Routes:

External Routes:
None

See also
List of parishes in New Brunswick

Notes

References

Local service districts of Kings County, New Brunswick
Parishes of Kings County, New Brunswick